Stalin, a 1997 biography  by Edvard Radzinsky of Joseph Stalin, politician and head of the Soviet Union for decades, reflects the author's research in Russia's secret archives and consultation with living sources. The archives were opened and declassified in 1991, after the dissolution of the Soviet Union.

Radzinsky is a popular Russian playwright. He also wrote a bestselling history, The Last Czar: The Life and Death of Nicholas II (1992), and forty other popular histories, including others about the Russian Imperial family.

Reception
Christopher Lehmann-Haupt of the New York Times describes this work as a dramatic, "bitterly condemnatory life of Stalin," based on Radzinsky's interviews and correspondence with numerous survivors of that era, as well as the author's research in newly opened and declassified Russian archives. Lehmann-Haupt compares this to the bitterly angry tone of Alexander Solzhenitsyn's The Gulag Archipelago.

He believes there are too many assertions that rely on anecdote rather than documented evidence from the archives, and that Radzinsky raises questions, but comes to anticlimactic and weakly supported conclusions. For instance, there is little evidence to support his assertion that Stalin's second wife did not commit suicide.

He did say that elements of Stalin's relationship with Lenin and his use of terrorism, as discussed by Radzinsky, "accorded" with preceding academic works, such as "Robert Conquest's Stalin: Breaker of Nations (1991) and by Mr. Radzinsky's predecessor into Soviet archives, Gen. Dmitri Volkogonov, in Stalin: Triumph and Tragedy (1991)."

The "Publishers Weekly" characterizes the book as "a vivid, astonishingly intimate biography of Joseph Stalin" based on previously unavailable primary-source documents of the communist party, the state and KGB.

References

External links
 

 Edvard Radzinsky — Author's site.

1996 non-fiction books
Russian biographies
Biographies of Joseph Stalin
Doubleday (publisher) books
Georgian biographies